F-15 Strike Eagle III is an F-15 Strike Eagle combat flight simulator released in 1992 by MicroProse and is the sequel of F-15 Strike Eagle and F-15 Strike Eagle II. It is the final game in the series.

The fighter is equipped with a M61 Vulcan and both air-to-air and air-to-ground missiles, as well as free-fall and laser-guided bombs. Available scenarios are:  Iraq, Panama, and Korea. Missions usually involve taking out one primary and one secondary target, while avoiding attacking friendly targets. The player can receive promotions and medals based on their mission scores.

For its time, Strike Eagle III boasted impressive graphics, although enemy planes are not nearly as detailed as the player's F-15. Special attention was put into the terrain and geography, to the extent that real buildings and geographical sites are visible ingame, such as the Iraqi Presidential Palace in Baghdad.

The enhanced CD-ROM edition adds 15 minutes of introductory video, a tutorial, and new scenarios, including flight missions based on those of the Desert Storm campaign.

Development
The game had a development budget of $1.2 million.

Reception
Computer Gaming Worlds reviewer, an F-16 pilot with the Vermont Air National Guard, in April 1993 praised F-15 IIIs graphics, detail, and realistic flight model. He disliked the slow performance, but concluded that "It definitely is a worthy simulation". In a January 1994 survey of wargames the magazine gave the title four stars out of five, stating that it had "state-of-the-art graphics and game value". In April 1994 the magazine said that the CD version was "a good buy for either the novice or veteran sim enthusiast". In August 1994 the magazine's simulation columnist called the flight model "a mixed bag", approving of aircraft performance varying by altitude but criticizing the "instantaneous" handling. He concluded that although superior to Falcon 3.0 in many areas, F-15 was not a simulation because "many things ... 'burst the bubble', that constantly reminded me this isn't for real".

Sales
The game sold 110,000 copies in its first two weeks, and 150,000 copies by February 1993.

References

External links

1992 video games
DOS games
DOS-only games
MicroProse games
Combat flight simulators
Video game sequels
Gulf War video games
Video games developed in the United States
Video games scored by Jeff Briggs
Video games set in Panama
Korean War video games
Video games set in Iraq
Video games set in 1989
Video games set in 1990